Barskovia is a torted conical shell known from earliest Cambrian small skeletal fossils, interpreted as a helcionelloid.

References

Helcionelloida